Constantine Arianites (died 1050) was a Byzantine general active in the Balkans against the Pechenegs.

He was possibly the son or otherwise a relative of David Arianites, a celebrated general under Basil II (r. 976–1025). He is first recorded in 1047, when the Pechenegs crossed the Danube and invaded Byzantine territory. At the time, according to John Skylitzes, he held the rank of magistros and the post of doux of Adrianople. In response to the Pecheneg attack, he was ordered to join with the officer commanding in Bulgaria, Basil Monachos, and the generals Michael and Kegenes (a baptised Pecheneg who had entered Byzantine service). The Byzantines managed to defeat and capture the Pechenegs, but instead of exterminating them, they were settled as colonists in the desolate plains of Moesia.

When the Pechenegs rebelled a few years later, Arianites was a senior officer in the army sent under the hetaireiarches Constantine to oppose them. Due to an ill-advised attack by a part of the Byzantine army, which left their fortified encampment to charge the Pechenegs on open field, the Byzantines suffered a heavy defeat at Basilike Libas near Adrianople: Arianites received a heavy wound by a javelin in the intestines and died two days after the battle, while another senior commander, Michael Dokeianos, was captured and killed by the Pechenegs. According to Rodolphe Guilland, he probably held the post of Domestic of the Schools of the West at that time.

References

Sources 
 
 
 

1050 deaths
11th-century Byzantine people
Constantine
Byzantine generals
Byzantine governors
Deaths by javelin
Domestics of the Schools
Magistroi